The 1891–92 Northern Football League season was the third in the history of the Northern Football League, a football competition in Northern England.

Clubs

The league featured 7 clubs which competed in the last season, along with two new clubs:
 Sheffield United
 South Bank

League table

References

1891-92
3